Malu Alb ("The White Bank") may refer to:
Malu Alb, a village in Drăgănești, Galați, Romania
Malu Alb, a village in Bujoreni, Vâlcea, Romania